In the computational complexity theory of counting problems, a polynomial-time counting reduction is a type of reduction (a transformation from one problem to another) used to define the notion of completeness for the complexity class ♯P. These reductions may also be called polynomial many-one counting reductions or weakly parsimonious reductions; they are analogous to many-one reductions for decision problems and they generalize the parsimonious reductions.

Definition
A polynomial-time counting reduction is usually used to transform instances of a known-hard problem  into instances of another problem  that is to be proven hard.

These two functions must preserve the correctness of the output. That is, suppose that one transforms an input  for problem  to an input  for problem , and then one solves  to produce an output . It must be the case that the transformed output  is the correct output for the original input .

Relation to other kinds of reduction
As a special case, a parsimonious reduction is a polynomial-time transformation  on the inputs to problems that preserves the exact values of the outputs. Such a reduction can be viewed as a polynomial-time counting reduction, by using the identity function as the function .

Applications in complexity theory
A functional problem (specified by its inputs and desired outputs) belongs to the complexity class ♯P if there exists a non-deterministic Turing machine that runs in polynomial time, for which the output to the problem is the number of accepting paths of the Turing machine. Intuitively, such problems count the number of solutions to problems in the complexity class NP. If, in addition,  itself belongs to ♯P, then  is said to be ♯P-complete. (Sometimes, as in Valiant's original paper proving the completeness of the permanent of 0–1 matrices, a weaker notion of reduction, Turing reduction, is instead used for defining ♯P-completeness.)

References

Reduction (complexity)